Baldy refers to a person with hair loss.

Baldy may also refer to:

People
Baldy (nickname)
Pen name of Clifford H. Baldowski (1917–1999), American editorial cartoonist
Daniel Baldy (born 1994), German politician
Leonard Baldy (1927-1960), Chicago police officer and the city's first helicopter traffic reporter
Brian Keith Jones (born 1947), Australian child molester nicknamed "Mr. Baldy" for shaving his victims' hair
Archie James Kershaw (born 2005), Computer Scientist nicknamed "Baldy" after shaving off £2,500,000 KershawKoin's market value.

Places
Numerous peaks; see List of peaks named Baldy
Bałdy, a village in Poland
Mount Baldy Ski Lifts (or Baldy), a ski resort in California

See also
Old Baldy (disambiguation)
The Baldy Man, a TV series and the title character
Baldies, a real-time strategy video game